Euparthenia is a subgenus of very small sea snails, pyramidellid gastropod mollusks, or micromollusks in the subfamily Turbonillinae.

The name Euparthenia is a replacement name for Parthenia Lowe, 1841 not Robineau-Desvoidy, 1830.

The genus Euparthenia contains both Recent and fossil species.

Shell description
The original description by Johannes Thiele (in English translation) is as follows: "Shell non-umbilicate, moderately turriculate, with spiral rings and ribs; columellar fold distinct. Kleinella (E.) bulinea (Lowe). A couple of species in the Mediterranean Sea and Atlantic Ocean."

The description of the type species by Richard Thomas Lowe (1841) reads:

"PARTHENIA BULINEA. P. testa subcylindaceo-attenuata, oblongiscula, juniore ovato-tereti: anfractibus planis, elegantissime reticulato-cancellatis, striis spiralibus crebris aequidistantibus, transversas aequidistantes decussantibus; sutura distincta impressa: columella postice torta, uniplicata. a. subventricosa."

Life habits
Little is known about the biology of the members of this genus. As is true of most members of the Pyramidellidae sensu lato, they are most likely to be ectoparasites.

Species
Species within the genus Euparthenia include:
 Euparthenia bulinea (Lowe, 1841) - type species, as Parthenia bulinea
 Euparthenia elegans 
 Euparthenia humboldti (Risso, 1926)
 Euparthenia nordmanni Sorgenfrei, 1958

References
This article incorporates public domain text from references 

 Monterosato T. A. (di) (1880). Nota sopra alcune conchiglie coralligene del Mediterraneo. Bullettino della Società Malacologica Italiana, Pisa 6: 243-259 p. 254-255
 Vaught, K.C. (1989). A classification of the living Mollusca. American Malacologists: Melbourne, FL (USA). . XII, 195 pp.
 Gofas, S.; Le Renard, J.; Bouchet, P. (2001). Mollusca, in: Costello, M.J. et al. (Ed.) (2001). European register of marine species: a check-list of the marine species in Europe and a bibliography of guides to their identification. Collection Patrimoines Naturels, 50: pp. 180–213

External links
 Euparthenia bulinea distribution
 Euparthenia bulinea image

Pyramidellidae
Gastropod subgenera